Bromodomain adjacent to zinc finger domain protein 1A is a protein that in humans is encoded by the BAZ1A gene.

Structure
The protein encoded by this gene belongs to a family of proteins which includes BAZ1B, BAZ2A, and BAZ2B. All family members contain the following domains and structural motifs:

 N-terminus – PHD finger (C4HC3 zinc finger)
 WAKZ motif
 LH (leucine-rich helical domain) motif
 C-terminus – bromodomain

Function
BAZ1A along with SMARCA5, POLE3, and CHRAC1 comprise the WCRF/CHRAC ATP-dependent chromatin-remodeling complex.

The purified CHRAC complex can mobilize nucleosomes into a regularly spaced nucleosomal array, and the spacing activity is ATP-dependent. Furthermore, the BAZ1A-SMARCA5 complex  enables DNA replication through highly condensed regions of chromatin.

Interactions
BAZ1A has been shown to interact with SMARCA5 and SATB1.

References

Genes on human chromosome 14